Seshachalam Hills are hilly ranges part of the Eastern Ghats in southern Andhra Pradesh state, in southeastern India. The Seshachalam hill ranges are predominantly present in Tirupati district of the Rayalaseema region in Andhra Pradesh, India.

Geology
The ranges were formed during the Precambrian supereon (3.8 billion to 539 million years ago). Minerals contained in these hills include sandstone and shale interbedded with limestone. The ranges are bounded by the Rayalaseema uplands to the west and northwest, and the Nandyal Valley to the north.

Religious significance
Tirupati, a major Hindu pilgrimage town is located in the hills. The hills contain seven peaks namely, Anjanadri, Garudadri, Narayanadri, Neeladri, Seshadri, Venkatadri and Vrishabhadri, the highest at about 600 m (2,000 ft) above sea level. The seven peaks are said to represent the seven hoods of Lord Adisesha, the king of serpents in Hindu mythology. The Srivenkateshwara National Park is also located in these ranges. The famous Natural Arch, Tirumala Hills is also a part of Seshachalam Hills, which dates back to the period in between Middle and Upper Proterozoic Eon.

The Seshachalam hill ranges running to North West to South East, over to a length about 80 km and width ranged from 32 to 40 km in the two Rayalaseema region districts, Tirupati and Kadapa. These ranges have typical gorges and gaps due to faulting and stream erosion resulting in to discontinuous ranges. The altitude of Seshachalam hill ranges varies from 168 to 1187 m above MSL. The highest hill peak is Tellaralla penta (1187 m) and most of the other hill peaks are above 900 m MSL.

Protected reserve forest
In 2010, it was designated as a Biosphere Reserve.
It has large reserves of red sandalwood which is used in medicines, soaps, spiritual rituals, etc.

Gallery

References

 Encyclopædia Britannica
 Temples and Legends of Andhra Pradesh
 Seshachalam Biosphere Reserve

Hills of Andhra Pradesh
Tirupati district
Tirupati
Eastern Ghats
Geography of Tirupati district